The women's 3 metre springboard diving competition at the 2010 Asian Games in Guangzhou was held on 26 November at the Aoti Aquatics Centre.

Schedule
All times are China Standard Time (UTC+08:00)

Results

Preliminary

Final

References 

Results
Results

Diving at the 2010 Asian Games